Statistics of Emperor's Cup in the 1930 season.

Overview
It was contested by 4 teams, and Kwangaku Club won the championship.

Results

Semifinals
Keio BRB 6–3 Nagoya Shukyu-dan
Kwangaku Club 8–5 Ryoyo Club

Final
 
Keio BRB 0–3 Kwangaku Club
Kwangaku Club won the championship.

References
 NHK

Emperor's Cup
1930 in Japanese football